Premio Lo Nuestro 2008 was held on February 21, 2008, at the American Airlines Arena in Miami, Florida. It was broadcast live by Univision Network.

Host
Pedro Fernández
Patricia Navidad

Performers
01. Intro — "Premio Lo Nuestro  20 Años Anniversario" — 01:02
02. Juanes (Opening Act) — "Me Enamora / Gotas De Agua Dulce" — 03:08
03. Cruz Martínez & Los Super Reyes — "Quédate Más (I Want You Back) / El Rey (Remix)" — 05:04
04. Pepe Aguilar — "Perdono Y Olvido / Río Rebelde / 100% Méxicano" — 04:51
05. Enrique Iglesias — "¿Dónde Están Corazón? / Dimelo" — 05:00
06. Maná — "Manda Una Señal" — 05:13
07. Olga Tañón — "¡Basta Ya! / Hoy Quiero Confesárme / Muchacho Malo / Es Mentiroso" — 06:00
08. Jenni Rivera — "Dama Divina" — 02:36
09. Wisin & Yandel — "Pégao / Sexy Movemento" — 04:40
10. Vicente Fernández — "Medley Rachero" — 14:56
11. Aventura — "El Prededor" — 04:00
12. Camilia — "Yo Quiero" — 03:39
13. Elvis Crespo with Grupo Manía (Closing Act) — "Me Miras Y Te Miro / Linda Eh / Un Beso / Suavemente" — 04:46

Presenters
Eduardo Verástegui
Patricia Manterola
Don Omar
Angélica Vale
Diana Reyes
Alexandra Cheron
Ilegales
Lucy Pereda
Antonio Vodanovic
Cristián de la Fuente
Dayanara Torres
René Strickler
JAN
Fanny Lu
Gloria Estefan
Grupo Montéz de Durango
Angélica María
Belinda
Tito "El Bambino"
Paul Rodriguez (appear)
Juan Luis Guerra
Lalo Rodríguez
Los Tigres del Norte
María Elena Salinas
Don Francisco
José José
Los Horóscopos de Durango
Fernando Allende
Karyme Lozano
Ivy Queen
Cristina Saralegui

Special awards

Premio Lo Nuestro a la Excelencia (Lifetime Achievement Award)
 Vicente Fernández

Maximum Excellence Award
 Ricky Martin

Trayectoria Artist of the Year
 Olga Tañón

Pop

Album of the Year
 Ayer Fue Kumbia Kings, Hoy Es Kumbia All Starz, A.B. Quintanilla III Presenta Kumbia All Starz
 Celestial, RBD
 El Tren de los Momentos, Alejandro Sanz
'Ricky Martin MTV Unplugged, Ricky Martin Secuencia, Reik

Male Artist Chayanne David Bisbal
 Enrique Iglesias
 Ricky Martin

Female Artist Belinda Julieta Venegas
 Paulina Rubio
 Yuridia

Group or Duo Camilia La 5ª Estación
 RBD
 Reik

Song of the Year
 "Chiquilla", Kumbia All Starz
 "Dímelo", Enrique Iglesias
 "Me Muero", La 5ª Estación "Todo Cambió", Camila "Tu Recuerdo", Ricky Martin Featuring La Mari de Chambao and Tommy Torres

Breakout Artist or Group of the Year
 Kumbia All Starz
 Beyoncé
 Los Super Reyes Jennifer LopezRock

Album of the Year
 Amantes Sunt Amentes, Panda
 Grrr!, Moderatto
 Masa Con Masa, Millo Torres and El Tercer Planeta
 Memo Rex Commander y el Corazón Atómico de la Vía Láctea, Zoé Oye, AterciopeladosArtist of the Year
 Allison Maná Moderatto
 Motel

Song of the Year Bendita Tu Luz, Maná and Juan Luis Guerra "Enamorado", Gustavo Laureano
 Manda Una Señal, Maná
 Ojalá Pudiera Borrarte, Maná
 "Sentimettal", Moderatto

Tropical

Album of the Year
 Arroz con Habichuela, El Gran Combo de Puerto Rico
 Haciendo Historia, Xtreme K.O.B. Live, Aventura La Llave de Mi Corazón, Juan Luis Guerra
 Soy Como Tú, Olga Tañón

Male Artist of the Year
 Fonseca Juan Luis Guerra Marc Anthony
 Tito Nieves

Female Artist of the Year
 Fanny Lu
 Gloria Estefan
 La India Olga TañónGroup or Duo of the Year Aventura El Gran Combo
 Ilegales & Alexandra
 Xtreme

Song of the Year
 "Los Infieles", Aventura
 "La Otra", Ilegales & Alexandra "Mi Corazoncito", Aventura "Que Me Des Tu Cariño", Juan Luis Guerra
 "Shorty Shorty", Xtreme

Merengue Artist of the Year
 Elvis Crespo
 Juan Luis Guerra Olga Tañón Toño Rosario

Tropical Salsa Artist of the Year
 El Gran Combo
 Frankie Negrón Marc Anthony Tito Nieves

Tropical Traditional Artist of the Year Aventura Fanny Lu
 Fonseca
 Xtreme

Regional Mexican Music

Album of the Year Crossroads: Cruce de Caminos, Intocable Ahora y Siempre, Alacranes Musical
 Detalles y Emociones, Los Tigres del Norte
 El Amor que Nunca Fue, Conjunto Primavera
 Recio, Recio Mis Creadorez, Los Creadorez del Pasito Duranguense de Alfredo Ramírez

Male Artist of the Year
 El Chapo de Sinaloa
 Joan Sebastian Marco Antonio Solís Mariano Barba

Female Artist of the Year
 Alicia Villarreal
 Diana Reyes
 Graciela Beltrán Jenni RiveraGroup or Duo of the Year
 Alegres de la Sierra
 Conjunto Primavera Intocable Los Tigres del Norte

Song of the Year
 "Dime Quien Es", Los Rieleros del Norte
 "Cada Vez Que Pienso en Ti", Los Creadorez del Pasito Duranguense de Alfredo Ramírez
 "De Rodillas Te Pido", Alegres de la Sierra "La Noche Perfecta", El Chapo de Sinaloa "Mil Heridas", Cuisillos

Banda of the Year
 Cuisillos
 El Chapo de Sinaloa Joan Sebastian La Arrolladora Banda El Limón

Grupera Artist of the Year
 Bronco El Gigante de América
 Bryndis
 Control Marco Antonio SolísNorteño Artist of the Year
 Alegres de la Sierra
 Conjunto Primavera Intocable Los Tigres del Norte

Ranchera Artist of the Year
 Alicia Villarreal
 Pedro Fernández Pepe Aguilar Vicente Fernández

Breakout Artist or Group of the Year
 Andrés Márquez Banda Guasaveña Fidel Rueda
 Los Buitres de Culiacán Sinaloa

Duranguense Artist of the Year
 Alacranes Musical
 Los Creadorez del Pasito Duranguense de Alfredo Ramírez Los Horóscopos de Durango Montez de Durango

Urban

Album of the Year
 El Cartel: The Big Boss, Daddy Yankee
 Los Vaqueros, Wisin & Yandel
 The Perfect Melody, Zion Sentimiento, Ivy Queen The Bad Boy, Héctor el Father

Artist of the Year
 Don Omar
 Héctor el Father
 R.K.M & Ken-Y Wisin & YandelSong of the Year
 "Igual Que Ayer", R.K.M & Ken-Y
 "Impacto (Remix)", Daddy Yankee Featuring Fergie "Pegao", Wisin & Yandel "Siente El Boom", Tito "El Bambino" Featuring Randy
 "Sola", Héctor el Father

Video of the Year
 "Baila Mi Corazón", Belanova"Impacto", Daddy Yankee Featuring Fergie'''
 Me Enamora, Juanes
 "Pa'l Norte", Calle 13 Featuring Orishas
 "Dímelo", Enrique Iglesias

Lo Nuestro Awards by year
2008 music awards
2008 in Florida
2008 in Latin music
2000s in Miami